The Harding Township School District is a community public school district that serves students in pre-kindergarten through eighth grade from Harding Township, in Morris County, New Jersey, United States.

As of the 2020–21 school year, the district, comprised of one school, had an enrollment of 274 students and 41.8 classroom teachers (on an FTE basis), for a student–teacher ratio of 6.6:1.

The district is classified by the New Jersey Department of Education as being in District Factor Group "J", the-highest of eight groupings. District Factor Groups organize districts statewide to allow comparison by common socioeconomic characteristics of the local districts. From lowest socioeconomic status to highest, the categories are A, B, CD, DE, FG, GH, I and J.

For ninth through twelfth grades, public school students attend Madison High School in Madison, as part of a sending/receiving relationship with the Madison Public Schools. As of the 2020–21 school year, the high school had an enrollment of 876 students and 74.6 classroom teachers (on an FTE basis), for a student–teacher ratio of 11.7:1.

History
In May 1974, the Harding Township School District was given permission by the State Commissioner of Education to end their sending / receiving relationship with the Morris School District at Morristown High School and begin sending their students to Madison High School starting with the 1975-76 school year, ruling that the withdrawal of the mostly white students from Harding Township would not "cause a disproportionate change in the racial composition of Morristown High School".

School
Harding Township School serves students in grades PreK-8. The school had an enrollment of 267 as of the 2020–21 school year.
April Friedman, Principal / Director of Curriculum

Notable alumni
 Meryl Streep (born 1949, graduated in 1963), actress.

Administration
Core members of the district's administration are:
Matthew A. Spelker, Superintendent
John Jennings, Business Administrator / Board Secretary

Board of education
The district's board of education is comprised of five members who set policy and oversee the fiscal and educational operation of the district through its administration. As a Type II school district, the board's trustees are elected directly by voters to serve three-year terms of office on a staggered basis, with either one or two seats up for election each year held (since 2012) as part of the November general election. One board member is assigned to serve as a representative to the board of education of the Madison Public Schools. The board appoints a superintendent to oversee the district's day-to-day operations and a business administrator to supervise the business functions of the district.

References

External links 

 
School Data for the Harding Township School, National Center for Education Statistics

Harding Township, New Jersey
New Jersey District Factor Group J
School districts in Morris County, New Jersey
Public K–8 schools in New Jersey